Alaeddine Ajeraie is a Moroccan professional footballer who plays as a forward for MAS Fes.

References

Moroccan footballers
Living people
1993 births
Association football forwards
Place of birth missing (living people)
RS Berkane players
Maghreb de Fès players